Rajasimha is a 2018 Indian Kannada-language action film directed by debutante Ravi Ram and produced by C. D. Basappa. The film features Aniruddha, Nikita Thukral and Sanjjanaa in the lead roles along with Bharathi Vishnuvardhan, Sharath Lohitashwa and Arun Sagar in key supporting roles. While Late Actor Ambareesh plays a cameo role, the popular late actor Vishnuvardhan appear on the screen through a computer generated visual effect. The film is reported to be a sequel of Vishnuvardhan's hit Simhadriya Simha (2002). The film's soundtrack is composed by Jassie Gift and the background score is by Sadhu Kokila.

The film released across Karnataka on 2 February 2018.

Cast
 Aniruddha as Satya
 Nikita Thukral as Priya
 Sanjjanaa
 Bharathi Vishnuvardhan
 Sharath Lohitashwa
 Arun Sagar
 Bullet Prakash
 Vijay Chendoor 
 Ambareesh

Soundtrack

The film's soundtracks are composed by Jassie Gift. The music rights were acquired by Anand Audio.

Reception

Critical response 

Sunayana Suresh of The Times of India scored the film at 2 out of 5 stars and says "given that this was a tribute film in many ways, one feels let down, as the matinee idol's name is dragged in a film that otherwise would be just another normal commercial potboiler. Though, do give it a try if you like old school masala films." A Sharadhha of The New Indian Express scored the film at 2 out of 5 stars and says "Time and again, attempts have been made to bring back legends on screen with little success, and Rajasimha is just another film to join the bandwagon."Vijaya Karnataka scored the film at 2 out of 5 stars and wrote "Experienced artists are directors who have used Tara, but have not used them properly. Suddenly the songs, laughter and comedy scenes have made Raja Sinha Cinema a falawa movie."

References

External links
 
 
 Raja Simha Movie - Aniruddh, Nikitha Thukral - Ravi -Jassie Gift - Released

2010s Kannada-language films
2010s romantic action films
Indian romantic action films
Films shot in Mysore
2018 directorial debut films
2018 action films